Ruth Núñez (born 7 April 1979) is a Spanish actress. She is perhaps the best known for her television roles of Bosnian girl Tanja Mitjović in Compañeros (1998–01) and Beatriz "Bea" Pérez Pinzón in Yo soy Bea (2006–08), the Spanish version of Ugly Betty. In 2016 she had a cast appearance with Andrea Duro in the ninth season of La que se avecina.

From 2006 until 2018 she dated with Alejandro Tous.

Filmography

Awards and nominations

References

External links 
 

1979 births
Living people
People from Málaga
Spanish stage actresses
Spanish film actresses
Spanish television actresses
21st-century Spanish actresses